The men's 20,000 m elimination race in inline speed skating at the 2001 World Games took place on 26 August 2001 at the Akita Prefectural Skating Rink in Akita, Japan.

Competition format
A total of 23 athletes entered the competition. From the best five athletes, who weren't be eliminated the fastest is a winner.

Results

References

External links
 Results on IWGA website

Inline speed skating at the 2001 World Games